The Penza electoral district was a constituency created for the 1917 Russian Constituent Assembly election.

The electoral district covered the Penza Governorate. 5 out of 11 submitted candidate lists were disqualified (and some additional lists submitted their lists too late to register). In Penza town there were 49,741 eligible voters, out of whom 17,583 voted (35%).

Results

References

Electoral districts of the Russian Constituent Assembly election, 1917